Sally Solomon (played by Kristen Johnston) is a fictional character from the television sitcom 3rd Rock from the Sun.

Role as female
Prior to arriving on Earth, the Solomons had some sort of contest or a bet to determine who would be male or female (their species makes no such differentiation). Sally, a highly trained, decorated, combined combat specialist/military tactician, became the woman, something she found to her disliking, at least at first.

Being in a body that was driven by stereotypical sitcom-female archetypes, Sally's innate penchant for violence was often at odds with the prejudices and natural tendencies associated with her sex. From this disjunction, most of the humor with her character is derived. She eventually manages the awkward harmony/truce with the human shell so classic of all the Solomons as the series progresses, coming to utilize her wiles to enjoy life as a female. But at first, Sally asked Dick why she was chosen to be the woman and Dick replies to her, "Because you lost."

Alternate universe
In the two-part episode "Dick'll Take Manhattan" from season six, in which The Solomons (Except Tommy) enter into an alternate reality, an alternate universe Sally writes a sex column for the newspaper (an homage to the Carrie Bradshaw character from the HBO comedy series Sex and the City). She finds out that she is still dating Don, who is now the Mayor of New York City. However, it turns out that he's actually just having an affair with her.

Romantic life
Of her forays into the romantic, her most successful was with Officer Don Orville, the first real example of martial authority she encountered on Earth. Their relationship lasted for half the series, ending when Sally discovered that Don's real passions lay in baking, as opposed to law enforcement, and she whipped him up into a force to be reckoned with, thus taking away the spark they once had. However moments after the two salute one another they begin passionately kissing each other.

Notes

External links
 TV.com's summary
 TV Guide's summary
 IMDB's summary

3rd Rock from the Sun characters
Fictional American Jews
Extraterrestrial characters in television
Fictional lieutenants
Fictional characters from Ohio
Television characters introduced in 1996